Empire Dragway, formerly known as New York International Raceway Park, is a quarter-mile drag strip just outside Leicester, New York. It is centrally located between Buffalo, Rochester, and Syracuse.

Iwas originally proposed as a full motorsports complex. Initially, there were ambitious plans to build a motorsports facility that would host oval racing, a full road course (which was to utilize the dragstrip as the front straight, as well as the dragstrip itself. Ultimately, the plans to build it were too expensive to complete once the dragstrip was finished. The track was first owned by Peter Geib and Ron Mangone and Abe Hamza. Mr Hamza was a concert promoter and Mr. Mangone was a successful contractor. Corwin Boddy designed the property area and Mr Mangone's company built the track. It was originally called Empire Dragway, then became Dragway 36, followed by Motorcity Raceway, NYIRP and ultimately reverted to the name "Empire Dragway". The track first opened on August 29, 1971. For a few years, it hosted what was to become a popular annual event in the '70s:  The "Gold Cup". Over the years that followed, many promoters leased the facility to hold drag racing and also other events. The track faced major financial difficulties from the start and was eventually taken over by Livingston County for unpaid taxes in the mid-80s. The track fell into disrepair and suffered some other damage due to being inoperative for nearly two years without proper maintenance. It was originally called Empire Dragway, then became Dragway 36, followed by Motorcity Raceway, NYIRP and ultimately reverted to the name "Empire Dragway". The track first opened on August 29, 1971. The longest running consecutive seasons occurred while it was owned and operated by Bob and Donna Metcalfe, who acquired it in 1986. It had an abbreviated opening season beginning in August of that year. Their first full season in 1987 had sanctioning from NHRA (National Hot Rod Association). In anticipation of hosting future National Events, a change of sanctioning bodies was made to IHRA (International Hot Rod Association) in 1989 and held its first IHRA Empire Nationals the following year. Many schedule changes and facility improvements were made under Metcalfe's ownership. It once ran "test and tune" and bracket racing for trophies on Wednesday nights. Friday night the track was open to everyone for test and tune. Once a month the track held a "MOMS" events usually on a Friday night. "MOMS" stood for Mustang on Mustang Shootout (now defunct), and had been running pro-tree & heads-up racing at NYIRP since 1994. Typically fifty to one hundred plus "pony cars" regularly showed up to race at each of these events. On Saturdays, the track still runs its full bracket points program for paid purses. The track's original name--"Empire Dragway", was resurrected following the 2008 season. At the end of the 2013 season, a Livingston County successful businessman, Jerry Scaccia and wife Clara, purchased the facility and intended to operate it on Wednesday, Friday and Saturday nights; The track has undergone many major improvements since the change in ownership—long needed basic maintenance, repaving, a new competitor entrance was constructed which made easier access for racers, much needed new drainage, rebuilt timing tower, updated timing system, improved lighting and installation of concrete barriers running the full length of the strip on both sides, with other minor changes as well. The Scaccia's first season began 4/19/2014; the inaugural full season ended 10/25/2014. The Scaccia's still own and operate the facility and continue to make further updates and improvements.

External links

as of 2014 Official website
former official website- using this will link to above URL
Official website

Drag racing venues
Sports venues in New York (state)
Sports venues in Livingston County, New York
1960s establishments in New York (state)